General elections were held in Mauritius on 5 May 2010. The coalition comprising Mauritius Labour Party under Navin Ramgoolam, the Militant Socialist Movement under Pravind Jugnauth and the Mauritian Social Democrat Party under Xavier Luc Duval, won a majority with 41 seats in the parliament. The Mauritian Militant Movement-led coalition under Paul Berenger finished second with 18 seats. The Mauritian Solidarity Front won one seat and the Rodrigues Movement won the two remaining seats. The elections were the ninth to be held since independence from the United Kingdom in 1968.

The Mauritius Labour Party, the Mauritian Social Democrat Party (PMSD) and the Militant Socialist Movement (MSM) formed an electoral coalition called Alliance de L'Avenir for this election. Ramgoolam, the alliance leader, allotted 35 seats to his own party to compete for the 60 seats on the island, whereas the MSM was given 18 and the PMSD 7. Before the election, it appeared that Berenger might gain back the PM's post that he held from 2003 to 2005; he was the first prime minister since independence that was not of South Asian origin.  Berenger led his own alliance of parties, known as the Alliance du Coeur, a reference to the official logo of the Mauritian Militant Movement, by far the biggest party in that alliance. Parties based in Rodrigues compete for the two remaining seats, with the Rodrigues People's Organisation and the Rodrigues Movement being the main parties there.

During the election, 62 seats in the National Assembly of Mauritius were contested with a further 8 seats to be designated by the electoral commission under a complex formula designed to keep a balance of ethnic groups in the parliament.  The candidates must declare which ethnic group (Hindu, Muslim, Chinese or "general population") they belong to in order to run for a seat. In 2010, 104 of the candidates refused to do so, resulting in them being disqualified, leaving 529 candidates for the seats.  Around 130 foreign observers, including some from the African Union and the Southern African Development Community, were present to monitor the voting process.

Around 900,000 people were eligible to vote in the election. The main issues debated were economic and constitutional reform, fraud, corruption, drug trafficking and ethnicity. Paul Berenger accused the incumbent government of abusing the state-owned television station, the Mauritius Broadcasting Corporation, to influence voters. He also accused his political opponents of using communalism and of negatively drawing attention to his minority Franco-Mauritian ancestry to swing voters against him.

The Alliance de l'Avenir obtained 49.31% of the total votes and 41 seats whereas the Alliance du Coeur seized 42.36% of votes and 18 seats. The remaining parties and independent candidates obtained 8.14% of the votes. From the 62 seats, only ten women were elected.

After the Alliance de L'Avenir was declared winner of the poll, its leader, Navin Ramgoolam, mentioned that he would govern in the interest of every Mauritian so that no one would be left behind. He added that the priorities of his government were the improvement of road infrastructures, the security of the people, education, health and youth development.  Paul Berenger, who conceded defeat after the election, said that members of his party would continue their fight for a better Mauritius. He claimed that this election had not been free and fair, attributing the defeat of his alliance to numerous factors including biased coverage of the election by the state-owned television station, more financial resources by his political opponents, communalism and the electoral system. However, he would be prepared to work with the government for electoral reform, especially because his alliance had obtained only 18 of the 62 seats despite seizing 43% of popular votes.

On May 7, 2010, the Electoral Supervisory Commission made their decision on the non-elected candidates to occupy the 8 additional seats in the National Assembly based on the religious and ethnic declarations of the candidates not elected, a system referred to as the 'Best Loser system'. Exceptionally, instead of 8, only 7 candidates were designated. Per the normal procedure, 4 best loser seats are allotted to candidates not elected but having obtained the highest percentage of votes as a member of a political party. However, they had to be of an appropriate religion or ethnic to maintain a balance in the parliament. 4 other seats are to be allotted so as not to change the result of the election. The Alliance de L'Avenir was allotted 4 additional seats whereas the Alliance du Coeur obtained 2 additional seats. Whereas the Electoral Supervisory Commission had no problem in attributing one seat to one candidate of the Rodrigues People's Organisation, they had difficulty in choosing a candidate for the 8th seat, which normally has to be a Sino-Mauritian of one of the two other successful parties in this election. But given neither the Mauritian Solidarity Front nor the Rodrigues Movement had candidates of this community during this election, no candidate was named for the 8th additional seat.

Observers from the African Union for this election declared that the Best Loser system is problematic for the national unity of the country though it can reinforce social cohesion. They also considered the 2010 Mauritian general elections to have been 'free and transparent'.

Results

References

Elections in Mauritius
Mauritius
General election